The Nebraska Treasurer is the chief financial officer in the U.S. state of Nebraska.

List of territorial treasurers

List of state treasurers
Parties

Notes

References